Samuel Leonard King (27 March 1911 – 24 February 2003) was an English professional golfer, best known for playing on three Ryder Cup teams.

King was born in Sevenoaks, Kent, England, a short distance from the Knole Golf Club, and lived there most of his life. His father was a charcoal burner at the Knole House Estate. King became a caddy at the club as a boy, and learned to play.  By 1929, he was the assistant club professional, and began playing in local and national tournaments. In his career, King had nine top-10 finishes at The Open Championship between 1939 and 1959.

King was a member of Great Britain's 1937, 1947, and 1949 Ryder Cup teams, including scoring his team's only point in 1947. He had qualified for the 1939 team, but the event was cancelled after the outbreak of World War II.  During the war, he served in the Home Guard before returning to professional golf in 1946.

King became the head professional at Knole Golf Club in 1955, and later won the PGA Seniors Championship in both 1961 and 1962.  He retired in 1976 and moved to Lincolnshire.

King died at age 91 in 2003, after being hospitalized for pneumonia.  He is buried at St. Peter and St. Paul's church in Seal, Kent.

Professional wins (20)

Major tournament wins (8)
1933 Daily Mirror Assistants' Tournament
1936 Dunlop-Southern Tournament
1937 Daily Mail Tournament, Dunlop-Southern Tournament
1944 Yorkshire Evening News Tournament
1949 Yorkshire Evening News Tournament
1961 PGA Seniors Championship
1962 PGA Seniors Championship

Other tournament wins
Kent Professional Championship (14): 1932–1937, 1946–1951, 1955, 1960

Results in major championships

Note: King only played in The Open Championship.

NT = No tournament
CUT = missed the half-way cut
"T" indicates a tie for a place

Team appearances
Ryder Cup (representing Great Britain): 1937, 1947, 1949
England–Scotland Professional Match (representing England): 1934 (winners), 1936 (winners), 1937 (winners), 1938 (winners)
Llandudno International Golf Trophy (representing England): 1938 (winners)

References

English male golfers
Ryder Cup competitors for Europe
People from Sevenoaks
1911 births
2003 deaths